Clistax is a genus of flowering plants belonging to the family Acanthaceae.

Its native range is Brazil.

Species:

Clistax bahiensis 
Clistax brasiliensis 
Clistax speciosus

References

Acanthaceae
Acanthaceae genera